The Just A Game Stakes is a Grade I American Thoroughbred horse race for fillies and mares age four and up run over a distance of one mile (8 furlongs) on the turf held annually in June at Belmont Park in Elmont, New York. The event offers a purse of $500,000.

History

The race is named in honor of Peter Brant's filly, Just A Game, who was voted 1980 American Champion Female Turf Horse honors.

The event was inaugurated on Independence Day in 1992 and run over a distance of  miles on a muddy dirt track, won by Lady Lear who defeated the Irish Bred favorite by a length in a time of 2:15.

The event was not held in 1993 but the next year the event was moved to the turf and run over a mile.

The event was classified as a Grade III in 1997, upgraded to Grade II in 2004 and a Grade I in 2008.

The event carried Breeders' Cup incentives between 1996 and 2005 which were reflected in the name of the event.

Several mares have won this event who later became champions. The 2000 winner Perfect Sting later that year won the Breeders' Cup Filly & Mare Turf and was crowned US Champion Female Turf Horse. The 2004 British bred winner Intercontinental returned the following year only to get defeated into second place by Sand Springs but by the end of the season she made amends by winning Breeders' Cup Filly & Mare Turf and also becoming the 2005  
US Champion Female Turf Horse. The 2015 winner Tepin continued en route to a Breeders' Cup Mile win and honored as 2015 US Champion Female Turf Horse.

Records
Speed  record:
 1:31.64 – Celestine (2016)

Margins:
 6 lengths – Elizabeth Bay (1994)

Most wins:
 2 – Caress (1995, 1996)

Most wins by an owner:
 3 – Juddmonte Farms (2004, 2008, 2017)

Most wins by a jockey:
 4 – Javier Castellano (2011, 2014, 2017, 2019)

Most wins by a trainer:
 5 – William I. Mott (1994, 2005, 2007, 2010, 2016)
 5 – Chad C. Brown (2017, 2018, 2019, 2020, 2022)

Winners

Legend:

 
 

Notes:

† In 1996, Class Kris finished first but was disqualified and set back to second

§ Ran as part of an entry

See also
List of American and Canadian Graded races

References

Graded stakes races in the United States
Grade 1 turf stakes races in the United States
Mile category horse races for fillies and mares
Horse races in New York (state)
Recurring sporting events established in 1992
Belmont Park
1992 establishments in New York (state)